Fabrice Fiorèse (born 26 July 1975) is a French former professional footballer who played as a forward and winger.

Honours
Paris Saint-Germain
 Coupe de France: 2003-04

References

External links

1975 births
Living people
Sportspeople from Chambéry
French footballers
Olympique Lyonnais players
En Avant Guingamp players
Paris Saint-Germain F.C. players
Olympique de Marseille players
FC Lorient players
Amiens SC players
ES Troyes AC players
Ligue 1 players
Ligue 2 players
Al-Rayyan SC players
Association football midfielders
Association football forwards
Footballers from Auvergne-Rhône-Alpes